David Roger Barton (25 September 1946 – 4 November 2013) was an English footballer who made 83 appearances in the Football League playing for Lincoln City and Barnsley. He represented England at under-18 level. He began his professional football career with Wolverhampton Wanderers, but left the club before appearing in the league, and after leaving Barnsley he played in the Southern League for Worcester City. He played as a winger.

References

1946 births
2013 deaths
Footballers from Barnsley
English footballers
Association football wingers
Wolverhampton Wanderers F.C. players
Lincoln City F.C. players
Barnsley F.C. players
Worcester City F.C. players
English Football League players
Southern Football League players